Care Johnson (born ) is a British photographer and award winning fashion designer. She has previously been selected as ambassador for The Prince's Trust.

Life and career
Johnson left college at 16 and worked as a head show groom, where she used professional cameras.  When a childhood allergy forced to abandon this career, she took up photography.  In 2012, she was chosen from a number of Princes Trust-supported photographers across the UK by Rankin to work with him on an advertising creative for the The Prince's Trust.

Johnson appeared on Glamour magazines 'One to Watch 2014' list. In September 2014 Johnson won 'The Good Samaritan Award' at The Youth 4 Excellence Awards Ceremony held in Birmingham. Care Johnson is an award winning designer having been awarded an artisan award for adults clothing and was runner up for the arts award.

References

1990s births
Living people
English women photographers
British fashion designers
British women bloggers
People from Dewsbury
21st-century British photographers
Photographers from Yorkshire
21st-century women photographers